Koolerz was a chewing gum that produced a cool feeling in the mouth when chewed that was produced by The Hershey Company. It was introduced in the year 2001 and came in small packs. It has since been discontinued.

There were six flavors:
Lemonade
Berry
Peppermint
Strawberry
Mango Splash
Piña Colada

External links 
 Official website (archived, 12 Feb 2005)

 

Chewing gum
The Hershey Company brands